Miguel Ligero (1911–1989) was a film, television and theater actor from Argentina.

Biography

Ligero was born in 1911 in Rosario, Santa Fe.
In 1938 he made his film debut with The Caranchos of Florida and went on to appear in some twenty films. 
For his work in Castigo al traidor (Punishment to the Traitor) and El ojo que espía (the spying eye), both from 1966, he was awarded the Silver Condor award for best supporting actor.
In 1965 he received the Martin Fierro Award for Best Actor in a novel. 
Other works were Palo y hueso (1967), La guerra del cerdo (1975), El soltero (1977) and El hombre del subsuelo (1981).

In theater he worked with Luis Arata, Enrique de Rosas and Olinda Bozán and acted for several seasons at the Teatro General San Martín. 
Among other works, he appeared in Waiting for Godot and The Caucasian Chalk Circle. 
After the beginning of television soap operas he worked on Señorita Medianoche (Miss Midnight - 1963), Mariana and other programs. 
He was received the Konex Award in 1981 in the category of Actor in a Comedy Film and Theater.

He died on 1 February 1989 (aged 77) in Buenos Aires, Argentina after a heart attack.

Films
Miguel Ligero appeared in the following films:
1938 The Caranchos of Florida
1943 Los Hombres las prefieren viudas
1950 La Vendedora de fantasías
1951 Cuidado con las mujeres
1952 Como yo no hay dos
1953 The Black Market 
1954 Torrente indiano
1954 Un Hombre cualquiera
1955 El Juramento de Lagardere
1958 Rosaura a las 10 (Rosaura at 10 O'Clock)
1960 Todo el año es Navidad
1962 El hombre que perdió su risa
1962 Mañana puede ser verdad (TV series)
1964 La Cigarra no es un bicho
1965 Psique y sexo
1966 El Ojo de la cerradura
1966  El ojo que espía
1966 Castigo al traidor  (Punishment to the Traitor)
1968 Palo y hueso as Don Arce
1969 Flor de piolas
1969 Newcomers to Love
1970 Esta noche... miedo (TV series)
1974 Los bulbos (TV mini-series)
1975 A World of Love
1975 La Guerra del cerdo (Diary of a Pig War) as Jimmy Neuman
1976 Tiempos duros para Drácula
1977 El soltero
1979 Mañana puedo morir (TV movie)
1980 Frutilla
1981 El hombre del subsuelo (The Underground Man) as Severo
1983 Amar... al salvaje (TV series) as Serafín
1988 Apartment Zero as Mr. Palma
1989 Eversmile, New Jersey as Brother Felix

Theatre

Tangolandia (1957)
Discepoliana (1966)
El Señor Puntila Y Su Chofer (1965)
Mustafá (1977)
Esperando a Godot (Waiting for Godot)
El círculo de tiza caucasiano (The Caucasian Chalk Circle)

Television

 Amar... al salvaje (1983) Series .... Serafín (1983)
 Quiero gritar tu nombre (1981) Series .... (1981)
 Mañana puedo morir (1979) (TV)
 Los bulbos (1974)  mini-series
 Alta comedia  (episode Los árboles mueren de pie (1974)  .... Balboa
 Esta noche... miedo (1970) Series
 El mundo del espectáculo (1968) Series
 Burbuja (1967) Series .... León Ramos
 Mariana (1966) Series .... Padre Florencio
 Show Standard Electric (1965) mini-series .... (1965)
 Candilejas (1965) Series .... Felipe
 Dos gotas de agua (1964) Serie .... Don Paco
 Señorita Medianoche (1963) Serie .... Don César
 Mañana puede ser verdad (episodio El hombre que perdió su risa (1962) series.
 Blum
 Teatro como en el Teatro

References

1911 births
1989 deaths
Argentine male actors
Argentine male television actors
20th-century Argentine male actors